

Plants

Angiosperms

Arthropods

Arachnids

Newly named crustaceans

Conodont paleozoology 
Willi Ziegler and Charles A. Sandberg described the conodont genus Alternognathus.

Archosauromorphs

Newly named archosauromorphs

Newly named dinosaurs 
Data courtesy of George Olshevsky's dinosaur genera list.

Newly named birds

Pterosaurs

References

 
Paleontology